Ristovac (Serbian Cyrillic: Ристовац) is a small town in the Municipality of Vranje located in the Pčinja District of south-east Serbia. Ristovac has 342 according to the 2002 census.

Populated places in Pčinja District